Efren Alberto de la Cruz Mieles (born March 25, 1989 in Portoviejo) is an Ecuadorian footballer.

External links
de la Cruz's FEF player card 

1989 births
Living people
People from Portoviejo
Association football midfielders
Ecuadorian footballers
L.D.U. Quito footballers